Enterprise was a private wooden motorboat owned by Elsie C. Stewart purchased by the United States Navy for $24,101 for non-commissioned  service as a Section Patrol craft with the assigned number 790 in the 2nd Naval District during the period of United States participation in World War I.

Footnotes

References

See also 
List of ships of the United States Navy named Enterprise

Patrol vessels of the United States Navy
World War I patrol vessels of the United States
Motorboats of the United States Navy